Coleotechnites argentiabella is a moth of the family Gelechiidae. It is found in North America, where it has been recorded from Texas.

There is a small dark brown spot on the extreme costa at the base of the forewings, followed by three others within the margin, and there is also a small one within the dorsal margin near the base and there is a transverse brown spot or line on the fold, and another at the end of the disc, a brownish fascia at the beginning of the cilia, and a brownish golden streak around the apex at the base of the cilia.

References

Moths described in 1874
Coleotechnites